No Rest for the Wicked may refer to:
A translated proverb From the Book of Isaiah verses 48:22 and 57:20-21 Quoted in biblical sense for centuries, humorous secular sense popularized from 1930s,

Music

Albums
 No Rest for the Wicked (Helix album) (1983)
 No Rest for the Wicked (New Model Army album) (1985)
 No Rest for the Wicked (Ozzy Osbourne album) (1988)
 No Rest for the Wicked, a 1992 album by  Mentallo and the Fixer

Songs
 "No Rest for the Wicked" (Lykke Li song) (2014)
 "No Rest for the Wicked", a 1982 song by Nomeansno from Mama
 "No Rest for the Wicked", a 1995 song by Cypress Hill from Cypress Hill III: Temples of Boom
 "No Rest for the Wicked", a 1995 song by Leæther Strip from Legacy of Hate and Lust
 "No Rest for the Wicked", a 1995 song by Bloodhound Gang from Use Your Fingers
 "No Rest for the Wicked", a 2006 song by Godsmack from IV
 "No Rest for the Wicked", a 2010 song by (hed) p.e. from Truth Rising
 "No Rest for the Wicked", a 2011 song by a Hawk and a Hacksaw from Cervantine
 "No Rest for the Wicked", a 2011 song by Saxon from Call to Arms

Other uses
 No Rest for the Wicked (film), a 2011 Spanish film
 No Rest for the Wicked (webcomic), a webcomic by Andrea L. Peterson
 "No Rest for the Wicked" (Supernatural), a 2008 episode of Supernatural
 No Rest for the Wicked, a novel by Kresley Cole

See also
 "Ain't No Rest for the Wicked", a 2008 song by Cage the Elephant
 "No Peace for the Wicked", a 1978 song by Rory Gallagher from Defender
 "No Peace for the Wicked", a 1984 song by Thompson Twins from Into the Gap
 "No Rest 4 The Wicket", a 2009 song by Esham from I Ain't Cha Homey